Claudia Müller-Ebeling (born 1956), is a German anthropologist and art historian. She has coauthored with her husband Christian Rätsch (and in association with others) a number of works of shamanic pharmacopoeia, ethnopharmaceuticals and ethnohallucinogens. Müller-Ebeling resides in Hamburg, Germany.

Works
 Müller-Ebeling, Claudia and Christian Rätsch and Surendra Bahadur Shahi (2002). Shamanism and Tantra in the Himalayas. Transl. by Annabel Lee. Rochester, Vt.: Inner Traditions International;
 Witchcraft Medicine: Healing Arts, Shamanic Practices, and Forbidden Plants (2003) ;
 Pagan Christmas: The Plants, Spirits, and Rituals at the Origin of Yuletide.
 Claudia Müller-Ebeling, Christian Rätsch and Arno Adaalars (2016). Ayahuasca:Rituals, Potions and Visionary Art from the Amazon Published by Divine Arts.

References

External links
 
 Erowid Claudia Müller-Ebeling Vault

German art historians
Living people
1956 births
Women art historians
German women historians